Pontiflex was a mobile advertising company based in Brooklyn,  NY.

History 
The company was founded in 2008 by Zephrin Lasker. In 2014, Pontiflex changed their name to Crossboard Mobile. 

In 2015 Crossboard Mobile was split into two parts and purchased by Flatiron Media and The Berry Company.

Products 
Pontiflex launched its self-serve mobile advertising product for small businesses - AdLeads in March 2012. The product acquired 5000 customers as of July, 2012. Pontiflex allows app developers to serve ads on mobile apps via AppLeads.

Pontiflex received attention in December 2012 when the Vatican announced Pope Benedict XVI’s Twitter handle as @pontifex. Hundreds of people started following the startup on Twitter which has a similar-sounding Twitter handle - @pontiflex  The company has raised a total of $22.5 million in funding to date. In January 2013 the company completed $7.7 million in Series D funding led by Talus Holdings, a media technology holding company principally backed by Blackstone's GSO Capital. Existing investors RRE Ventures, New Atlantic Ventures and Tribeca Venture Partners also participated in the round.

References

External links
 Pontiflex Website

Business services companies of the United States
Companies based in New York (state)